WUA may refer to:

 IATA code for Wuhai Airport, China
 Water user associations
 Workers and Unemployed Action
 World Umpires Association